Too Bright is the third album by American singer Perfume Genius, released on September 23, 2014.

The album reached number 77 on the UK Albums chart and peaked at number 83 in the United States.

Critical reception 

Too Bright has received critical acclaim. Metacritic, which assigns a normalized rating out of 100 to reviews from critics, gave the album an average score of 87, which indicates "universal acclaim".

Brandon Stosuy of Pitchfork gave the album a very positive review, stating, "A huge part of what makes the work so strong is the generous human spirit that bleeds into it, and Too Bright is the best example to date of the lengths he goes to confront his fears and demons. These songs feel less like songs and more like treasures, ones that fill you with power and wisdom, and as a result, Too Bright seems capable of resonating with, comforting, and moving anyone who's ever felt alienated, discriminated against, or "other-ized," regardless of sexual orientation." The album was given a score of 8.5 and was titled Best New Music.

Artwork 
The album artwork was shot by Luke Gilford and it showcases an androgynous Perfume Genius. It would encompass a bold and proud theme throughout Too Bright.

Conception and development 
In an interview for Refinery29, Perfume Genius said, "I don’t know, for a long time I had been kind of constantly seeking reassurance and acceptance all over the place, and wanting to be taken seriously but waiting for someone else to do it for me, do you know what I mean?.” He explains that this was a more serious approach to making this album. Too Bright further explores topics on sexuality, empowerment, and queer identity.

Track listing

Personnel
Main personnel
 Mike Hadreas – vocals, piano (1, 4, 6, 10), synth (3, 7, 9, 10), keyboards (2, 8), gong (5), handclaps (8), wurlitzer (11), composer, additional recording
 Adrian Utley – synth (2, 3, 5, 7, 8), bass guitar (2, 3, 5, 11), guitar (1, 11), winebox (5), fuzz bass (7), handclaps (8), engineer, mixing, producer
 Alan Wyffels – synth (3, 4, 8, 10), keyboards (2, 5), piano (6)
 Jim Barr – double bass (3, 4, 6)
 Herve Becart – drums (3, 5, 8)
 Ross Hughes – bass clarinet (3, 4, 10), saxophone (7)
 John Parish – drums (2, 7, 8, 11), shaker (5)

Additional personnel
 Greg Calbi – mastering
 Ali Chant – engineer, mixing, producer, handclaps (8)
 Alison Fielding – design
 Luke Gilford – photography

Charts

Pop culture
"Too Bright" was featured on the ABC legal drama How to Get Away with Murder's second season finale.
"Queen" was featured in the season one episode "eps1.3_da3m0ns.mp4" and season four episode "Hello, Elliot" of the USA Network television series Mr. Robot.
"Queen" was featured on the Hulu television series The Great in the season two episode titled "Heads It's Me".

References 

2014 albums
Perfume Genius albums
Matador Records albums
LGBT-related albums